The following is a timeline of the History of Uppsala.

Pre-christian Uppsala ( -1087) 
 ca 1000 BC – Håga mound.
 ca 800 BC – Granhammarsmannen.
 ca 0 – Yngvi found the city of Gamla Uppsala according to Heimskringla.
 98 – Oldest known reference to the Svear is made by Tacitus.
 550–625 – Gamla Uppsala archaeological area.
 984 – Battle of Fýrisvellir.
 1087 – Temple at Uppsala is burned.

Medieval Uppsala (1087–1521) 
 1160 – Erik den helige is murdered in Uppsala.
 1164 – Gamla Uppsala becomes Sweden's archdiocese.
 1246 – Katedralskolan is founded.
 1247 – A franciscan convent is erected in Uppsala.
 1268 – Uppsala burns for the fourth time. 
 1273 – The Archdiocese of Uppsala is moved from Gamla Uppsala to Uppsala.
 1296 – Birger Magnusson vindicates Upplandslagen.
 14th century – Ärkebiskopsborgen, the castle of the Archbishop of Uppsala, is constructed at the site of the current University Hall. 
 1435 – The construction of Uppsala cathedral is completed..
 1437 – Several buildings are damaged in a city fire.
 1473 – Uppsala is almost devastated by a city fire.
 1477 – Uppsala university opens.
 1497 – Uppsala receives town privileges.
 1520 – Good Friday battle of Uppsala is fought.
 1521 – Conquest of Uppsala occurs.

Vasa era (1520–1718) 
 1543 – In a whide spread city fire most of the eastern city is destroyed.
 1549 – Construction of Uppsala Castle begins.
 1567 – Oldest parts of Uppsala Castle are completed.
 1567 – Sture Murders are committed at Uppsala Castle.
 1572 – Swedish Church Ordinance 1571 is adopted in Uppsala.
 1572 – Uppsala castle is partly destroyed due to a suspected arson.
 1593 – Uppsala Synod.
 1622 – Construction of Gustavianum begins.
 1643 – The first city plan is adopted.
 1654 – Queen Christina of Sweden announces her abdication in Uppsala.
 1663 – The student nations of Uppsala are legalized by the Konsistorium of the university.
 1669 – The Codex Argentus is donated to Uppsala university.
 1675 – The parliament of 1675 is held in Uppsala.
 1702 – Most of Uppsala is destroyed in a comprehensive city fire.
 1708 – Akademiska sjukhuset is founded.

Age of Liberty and the Gustavian era (1718–1809) 
 1741 – Carl von Linné becomes a professor at Uppsala university.
 1741 – Anders Celsius inaugurates Sweden's first observatory, located in Celsiushuset, Uppsala.
 1766 – A city fire ruins parts of eastern Uppsala.
 1791–1794 – Vitterhetssamfundet in Uppsala.

Union era (1809–1905) 
 1809 – A city fire rages in Uppsala.
 1841 – Carolina Rediviva is inaugurated.
 1843 – Uppsala host the first nordic student meeting.
 1855 – Foundation the female seminary Klosterskolan.
 1856 – Uppsala host a second nordic student meeting.
 1858 – A new city plan is adopted. Uppsala expands beyond the urban square of 1643.
 1865 – Foundation of the secondary school Uppsala högre elementarläroverk för flickor for girls. 
 1866 – Uppsala Central Station is inaugurated.
 1867 – The first parts Akademiska sjukhusets current locals are inaugurated.
 1872 – Betty Pettersson becomes Uppsala university's, and Sweden's, first female student.
 1875 – Uppsala hosts the final nordic student meeting.
 1887 – University Hall is inaugurated by Oscar II of Sweden.
 1890 – Upsala Nya Tidning is founded.

War era (1905–1945) 
 1907 – IK Sirius is founded.
 1909 – Studenternas IP is inaugurated.
 1922 – Statens institut för rasbiologi is founded as the first official state institute for eugenics.
 1932 – Fredrik von Sydow kills himself and his wife Ingun during an attempt to arrest the couple for the Von Sydow murders.
 1939 – Bollhusmötet is held in Uppsala. 
 1943 – The Easter riots takes place in Gamla Uppsala.

Modern Uppsala (1945–) 
 1958–1978 – Most of the city core experience a comprehensive urban renewal.
 1983 – Livets Ord is founded in Uppsala.
 1995 – Uppsala Mosque is inaugurated.
 2007 – Uppsala Konsert & Kongress is inaugurated.
 2011 –  The population of Uppsala Municipality surpasses 200 000 persons.

See also
 Timelines of other municipalities in Sweden: Gothenburg, Stockholm

References 

 
 
Uppsala